

Democratic Party nomination

Primaries
In August 2018, the Democratic National Committee voted to disallow superdelegates from voting on the first ballot of the nominating process, beginning with the 2020 election. This required a candidate to win a majority of pledged delegates from the assorted primary elections in order to win the party's nomination. The last time this did not occur was the nomination of Adlai Stevenson II at the 1952 Democratic National Convention. Meanwhile, six states used ranked-choice voting in the primaries: Alaska, Hawaii, Kansas, and Wyoming for all voters; and Iowa and Nevada for absentee voters.

After Hillary Clinton's loss in the previous election, the Democratic Party was seen largely as leaderless, and was also seen as fractured between the centrist Clinton wing and the more progressive Sanders wing of the party, echoing the rift brought up in the 2016 primary election. In 2018, several U.S. House districts that Democrats hoped to gain from the Republican majority had contentious primary elections. Politicos Elena Schneider described these clashes as a "Democratic civil war". During this period, there was a general shift to the left in regards to college tuition, healthcare, and immigration among Democrats in the Senate.

Overall, the 2020 primary field had 29 major candidates, breaking the record for the largest field under the modern presidential primary system previously set during the 2016 Republican Party presidential primaries with 17 major candidates.

Entering the Iowa caucuses on February 3, 2020, the field had decreased to 11 major candidates. Results were delayed in Iowa, with Pete Buttigieg winning in state delegate equivalents despite Bernie Sanders winning more votes, followed by Sanders narrowly winning over Buttigieg in the February 11, New Hampshire primary. Following Michael Bennet, Deval Patrick, and Andrew Yang dropping out, Sanders won the Nevada caucuses on February 22. Joe Biden then won the South Carolina primary, causing Buttigieg, Amy Klobuchar, and Tom Steyer to abandon their campaigns (Buttigieg and Klobuchar then immediately endorsed Biden). After Super Tuesday, March 3, Michael Bloomberg and Elizabeth Warren quit the race, leaving three candidates left: Biden and Sanders, the main contenders, and Tulsi Gabbard, who remained in the race despite facing nigh-on insurmountable odds. Gabbard then dropped out and endorsed Biden after the March 17, Arizona, Florida, and Illinois races. On April 8, 2020, Sanders dropped out, reportedly after being convinced by former president Barack Obama, leaving Biden as the only major candidate remaining, and the presumptive nominee. Biden then gained endorsements from Obama, Sanders and Warren. By June 5, 2020, Biden had officially gained enough delegates to ensure his nomination at the convention, and proceeded to work with Sanders to develop a joint policy task force.

Vice presidential selection

Senator Kamala Harris was announced as former Vice President Joe Biden's running mate on August 11, 2020. When inaugurated, Harris will be the first woman, first African-American, and first Asian-American vice president of the United States, as well as the second person with non-European ancestry (after Herbert Hoover's vice-president Charles Curtis). She is the third female vice presidential running mate after Geraldine Ferraro in 1984 and Sarah Palin in 2008. She is the first person representing the Western United States to appear on the Democratic Party presidential ticket.

Nominee

Candidates
The following major candidates have either (a) served as vice president, a member of the cabinet, a U.S. senator, a U.S. representative, or a governor, (b) been included in a minimum of five independent national polls, or (c) received substantial media coverage.

Republican Party nomination

Primaries
In election cycles with incumbent presidents running for re-election, the race for the party nomination is usually pro-forma, with token opposition instead of any serious challengers and with their party rules being fixed in their favor. The 2020 election was not an exception; with Donald Trump formally seeking a second term, the official Republican apparatus, both state and national, coordinated with his campaign to implement changes to make it difficult for any primary opponent to mount a serious challenge. On January 25, 2019, the Republican National Committee unofficially endorsed Trump.

Several Republican state committees scrapped their respective primaries or caucuses, citing the fact that Republicans canceled several state primaries when George H. W. Bush and George W. Bush sought a second term in 1992 and 2004, respectively; and Democrats scrapped some of their primaries when Bill Clinton and Barack Obama were seeking reelection in 1996 and 2012, respectively. After cancelling their races, some states immediately pledged their delegates to Trump, while other states later held a convention or meeting to officially award their delegates to him.

The Trump campaign also urged Republican state committees that used proportional methods to award delegates in 2016 (where a state's delegates are divided proportionally among the candidates based on the vote percentage) to switch to a "winner-takes-all" (where the winning candidate in a state gets all its delegates) or "winner-takes-most" (where the winning candidate only wins all of the state's delegates if he exceeds a predetermined amount, otherwise they are divided proportionally) for 2020.

Nevertheless, reports arose beginning in August 2017 that members of the Republican Party were preparing a "shadow campaign" against the president, particularly from the party's moderate or establishment wings. Then-Arizona senator John McCain said, "Republicans see weakness in this president." Maine senator Susan Collins, Kentucky senator Rand Paul, and former New Jersey Governor Chris Christie all expressed doubts in 2017 that Trump would be the 2020 nominee. Senator Jeff Flake claimed in 2017 that Trump was "inviting" a primary challenger by the way he was governing.

Former Massachusetts Governor Bill Weld became Trump's first major challenger in the Republican primaries following an announcement on April 15, 2019. Weld, who was the Libertarian Party's nominee for vice president in 2016, was considered a long shot because of Trump's popularity within his own party and Weld's positions on issues such as abortion, gun control and same-sex marriage that conflicted with conservative positions on those issues. In addition, businessman Rocky De La Fuente also entered the race but was not widely recognized as a major candidate.

Former Illinois representative Joe Walsh launched a primary challenge on August 25, 2019, saying he would not vote for Trump if Trump became the nominee. Walsh ended his presidential bid on February 7, 2020, after drawing around 1% support in the Iowa caucuses. Walsh declared that "nobody can beat Trump in a Republican primary" because the Republican Party was now "a cult" of Trump. On September 8, 2019, former South Carolina Governor and representative Mark Sanford officially announced that he would be another Republican primary challenger to Trump. He dropped out of the race 65 days later on November 12, 2019, after failing to gain support in Republican circles.

Trump's re-election campaign has essentially been ongoing since his victory in 2016, leading pundits to describe his tactic of holding rallies continuously throughout his presidency as a "never-ending campaign". On January 20, 2017, at 5:11p.m.EST, he submitted a letter as a substitute of FEC Form 2, by which he reached the legal threshold for filing, in compliance with the Federal Election Campaign Act. During the primary season, Trump ran an active campaign, even holding rallies in the February primary states, including South Carolina and Nevada where Republican primaries were canceled. Trump won every race and, having won enough delegates to ensure his nomination at the convention, became the presumptive nominee on March 17, 2020. Weld suspended his campaign the next day.

Nominee

Candidates
The following major candidates have either (a) held public office, (b) been included in a minimum of five independent national polls, or (c) received substantial media coverage.

Other parties and independent candidates

Libertarian Party nomination

Jo Jorgensen, who was the running mate of author Harry Browne in 1996, received the Libertarian nomination at the national convention on May 23, 2020. She achieved ballot access in all 50 states and the District of Columbia.

Nominee

Green Party nomination

Howie Hawkins became the presumptive nominee of the Green Party on June 21, 2020, and was officially nominated by the party on July 11, 2020. Hawkins was also nominated by the Socialist Party USA, Socialist Alternative, and the Legal Marijuana Now Party. Hawkins secured ballot access to 381 electoral votes and write-in access to 130 electoral votes.

Nominee

Other third-party and independent candidates

Various other minor party and independent candidates were on the ballot in several states, among them activist and writer Gloria La Riva, businessman and perennial candidate Rocky De La Fuente, coal executive Don Blankenship, entrepreneur Brock Pierce, rapper Kanye West, and educator Brian Carroll.

See also

 Protests against Donald Trump
 Social media in the 2020 United States presidential election
 2020 United States gubernatorial elections

Notes

References

External links
 General Elections, 3 November 2020, Reports and findings from the OSCE/ODIHR election observation mission

 
Donald Trump 2020 presidential campaign
Donald Trump
Mike Pence
Joe Biden 2020 presidential campaign
Joe Biden
Kamala Harris
Impact of the COVID-19 pandemic on politics
November 2020 events in the United States